Jeschke is a surname. Notable people with the surname include:

Alvin Jeschke, Czechoslovak canoeist
Andreas Jeschke (born 1966), German footballer and manager
Karl Jeschke (1890–?), German SS officer
Marta Jeschke (born 1986), Polish sprinter
Norman Jeschke (born 1979), German pair skater
Sabina Jeschke (born 1968), German scientist
Wolfgang Jeschke (1936–2015), German writer

Surnames from given names